Kenneth William Hirsch is an American pop songwriter, pianist and record producer, co-writer of the international 1982 hit "I've Never Been to Me" with Ron Miller.  He is also co-writer of the hits "If I Could", "No One in the World" and "Two Less Lonely People in the World". He was born in New York City, attended the Juilliard School of Music and got a BA from Queens College with a major in music.

His other co-writers include Hal David, Howard Greenfield, Doc Pomus, Gerry Goffin, Carole Bayer Sager, Paul Williams, Phil Cody, Wayland Holyfield, Allan Rich, Marti Sharron, Bruce Burch and Robin Lerner.
 
His songs have been recorded by, amongst others, Celine Dion, Anita Baker, Ray Charles, Charlene, Stevie Wonder, Barbra Streisand, Air Supply, Regina Belle, Dolly Parton, Millie Jackson, Mary J. Blige, Gladys Knight, Latoya London, Phyllis Hyman, Michael Bolton, Plácido Domingo, B. B. King, Johnny Adams, Genya Ravan, Dionne Warwick, Nancy Wilson, Teddy Pendergrass, and José Feliciano.

Hirsch composed the music to the musicals Daddy Goodness (co-written with Ron Miller) starring Tony Award winners Ted Ross and Clifton Davis and also Freda Payne. It played at the Forrest Theatre in Philadelphia and the National Theatre in Washington, D.C. in 1979.  He also wrote the music to the  Clothespins and Dreams (co-written with Ron Miller) starring Tony Award winner Barney Martin and also Eloise Laws. It played at the Pasadena Civic Auditorium in 1989.  In 2012, Ken co-wrote the score to An Officer and a Gentleman, The Musical co-written with Robin Lerner.  It premiered on May 18, 2012 in Sydney, Australia directed by Simon Phillips.  It was nominated for 5 Helpmann Awards including "Best Musical" and won for "Best Supporting Actor".

Selective list of Ken Hirsch songs
 "If I Could" (Ron Miller, Ken Hirsch, Marti Sharron) – Nancy Wilson (1988); Carl Anderson (1990); Regina Belle (1993); Barbra Streisand (1997, #1 US album); Celine Dion (2004) "A New Day" and Miracle Ray Charles,  Michael Bolton, Gladys Knight.
"No One in the World" (Ken Hirsch, Marti Sharron) - Anita Baker (1986) on the Grammy award-winning album Rapture, Dionne Warwick (1985) Finders of Lost Love (Dionne Warwick album)
"Two Less Lonely People in the World" - Air Supply (1983)
 "I've Never Been to Me" (Ron Miller, Ken Hirsch) – Charlene, 1982, US #3, UK #1, Canada #1, Australia #1. Soundtrack: "Priscilla, Queen of the Desert"; Soundtrack: "Shrek 3"; Soundtrack: "Priscilla, Queen of the Desert - The Musical".
  "There Is Always One More Time"  (Ken Hirsch, Doc Pomus) - B.B.King; Harry Connick Jr.; Johnny Adams - Soundtrack: Bowfinger.
  "Can't We Try"  (Ken Hirsch, Ron Miller)  Teddy Pendergrass
  "Soon As I Touched Him"  (Ken Hirsch, Norma Helms)  Dolly Parton
  "He Wants To Hear The Words"  (Ken Hirsch, Kathy Wakefeild)  Millie Jackson
  "Everybody Loves Me"  (Ken Hirsch, Doc Pomus)  Jose Feliciano
  "It All Goes By So Fast" (Ken Hirsch, Jay Levy)  Ray Charles & Mary J. Blige
  "You Were There"  (Ken Hirsch, Ron Miller)  Ray Charles & Gladys Knight
  "How I Love The Rain"  (Ken Hirsch, Rosie Casey)  Latoya London
  "Before We Say Goodbye"  (Ken Hirsch)  Soundtrack: 2gether
  "Used To Be"  (Ken Hirsch, Ron Miller)  Stevie Wonder & Charlene
  "Walk Away"  (Ken Hirsch, Marti Sharron)  Dionne Warwick; Phyllis Hyman
  "You Loved Away The Pain"  (Ken Hirsch, Ron Miller)  Gladys Knight; Hanne Boel
  "A Lady With A Song"  (Ken Hirsch, Smokey Bates)  Nancy Wilson
  "Save Your Nights For Me"  (Ken Hirsch, Mark Mueller)  Plácido Domingo
  "I Hate Myself" (Doc Pomus, Ken Hirsch) - Genya Ravan (1972); Anita Lane (2001)

References

External links
kennyhirsch.com
BMI.com
Ken Hirsch Songwriter Interview

American male songwriters
Year of birth missing (living people)
Living people
Musicians from New York City
Juilliard School alumni
Queens College, City University of New York alumni